Oebalus is a genus of stink bugs in the family Pentatomidae. There are about six described species in Oebalus.

Species
These six species belong to the genus Oebalus:
 Oebalus grisescens (Sailer, 1944) i c g
 Oebalus insularis Stål, 1872 i c g
 Oebalus mexicanus (Sailer, 1944) i c g b
 Oebalus poecilus (Dallas, 1851) g
 Oebalus pugnax (Fabricius, 1775) i c g b – rice stink bug
 Oebalus ypsilongriseus (De Geer, 1773) g b
Data sources: i = ITIS, c = Catalogue of Life, g = GBIF, b = Bugguide.net

References

Further reading

External links

 

Pentatomidae genera
Pentatomini